Sultan Saburovich Rakhmanov (6 July 1950 – 5 May 2003) was an Olympic weightlifter for the USSR who won the gold medal in the super heavyweight class of the 1980 Summer Olympics. Sultan Rakhmanov won the super heavyweight gold medal in 1980 in Moscow when his legendary teammate Vasily Alexeev was eliminated after he failed three times to snatch 180 kg. Rakhmanov made 6 perfect lifts to score a decisive victory at the 1980 Olympics. He also won gold medals at the World Weightlifting Championships in 1979 and 1980.

Rakhmanov's father was Uzbek and his mother was Ukrainian, he was born in Uzbekistan. He trained during his weightlifting career in Dnipropetrovsk, Ukraine. Rakhmanov was a member of the Soviet national weightlifting team for 9 years. His most memorable victory was, of course, the super heavyweight class gold medal at the 1980 Olympics. For that victory, Rakhmanov was awarded Order of the Red Banner of Labour in Kremlin.

After his retirement, Rakhmanov was the Chairman of the International Association of Disabled Sports Veterans. Sultan was an honored President of the Aikido Federation of Ukraine. He also was one of the pioneers of organized armwrestling in the Soviet Union.

Rakhmanov died on May 5, 2003 of a heart attack at age 52.

Weightlifting achievements 
 Gold medalist 1980 Summer Olympics.
 World Weightlifting Championships gold medalist (1979 and 1980).
 European Weightlifting Championships gold medalist (1980).
 Set two world records during career.

References 

1950 births
2003 deaths
People from Karakalpakstan
Olympic weightlifters of the Soviet Union
Ukrainian people of Uzbekistani descent
Olympic gold medalists for the Soviet Union
Ukrainian male weightlifters
Weightlifters at the 1980 Summer Olympics
Olympic medalists in weightlifting
Medalists at the 1980 Summer Olympics
European Weightlifting Championships medalists
World Weightlifting Championships medalists